William Glynne  was a  Welsh Anglican priest in the 16th century.

Glynne was educated at the University of Oxford. He held livings at Ysceifiog, Llandinam, Clynnog Fawr and Llanfwrog. Gwynn was Archdeacon of Anglesey from 1524 until his death in 1557.

References

Alumni of the University of Oxford
Archdeacons of Anglesey
17th-century Welsh Anglican priests